The Smith & Wesson M&P10 is Smith & Wesson's modified version of the AR-10 rifle.

Design details
The M&P10 series of rifles is based on the AR-10. Smith & Wesson offers the M&P10 semi-automatic rifles in a variety of configurations tailored to specific shooting applications and styles. The standard model has a six-position collapsible stock, 4140 steel barrel, 7075 T6 aluminum receiver and a hard-coat black anodized finish.

Variants
In 2013, the M&P10 line was expanded to include the .308 Winchester calibre.
Unveiled at 2013 SHOT Show, the rifle is available in several variants; the M&P10 (CA Compliant), M&P10 (Compliant), and the M&P10 CAMO are chambered in .308 Winchester.

 M&P10 CA Compliant: features a California Bullet Button, making it compliant for sale to civilians in California.
 M&P10 Compliant: features a fixed extended stock and non-threaded barrel, making it compliant for sale to civilians in Maryland, New Jersey, and New York. It was available in Massachusetts until the Attorney General, Maura Healy, issued a unilateral ban of it and all AR type rifles.
 M&P10 CAMO: features a Magpul Original Equipment rifle stock and hunter's camouflage finish on the receiver, handguard, and pistol grip.
 M&P10  Performance Center: chambered in 6.5mm Creedmoor, features a 20” barrel, Threaded Muzzle with Thread Protector, Two-Stage Match Trigger, Magpul Original Equipment rifle stock,  15” Free-Float Troy® M-LOK® handguard, 2” Aluminum M-LOK® Accessory Rail Panel and Magpul pistol grip.

See also
 Smith & Wesson M&P15

References

7.62×51mm NATO semi-automatic rifles
Smith & Wesson firearms
Rifles of the United States
ArmaLite AR-10 derivatives